In 2017 a drought ravaged Somalia that has left more than 6 million people, or half the country's population, facing food shortages with several water supplies becoming undrinkable due to the possibility of infection.

According to the Humanitarian Information Unit of the U.S. Government, over 2.9 million people in Somalia face crisis or emergency level acute food insecurity and need emergency food aid, as a result of below average to failed rains in many areas in 2016 that reduced crop production and harmed livestock. Somalia is currently facing its seventh consecutively poor harvest and food stability is a major issue. In the April–June rainy season little to no rainfall occurred across much of Somalia in April, but rain has begun and is forecasted in May. Lack of potable water has accelerated an acute watery diarrhea-cholera outbreak with an estimated 32,000 cases reported since the beginning of the year. 1.4 million children are projected to need treatment for acute malnutrition in 2017, according to the UN Children's Fund (UNICEF). FEWS NET expects 2.9 million people will remain in crisis and emergency levels of acute food insecurity through at least June 2017. In March 2017, 1.75 million people received international food assistance, according to the UN Office for the Coordination of Humanitarian Affairs (OCHA).

An estimated 1.1 million IDPs currently live in Somalia, and at least 548,000 additional people have been displaced since November 2016 due to the drought. Most people displaced by drought left rural parts of Bay, Lower Shabelle, and Sool and settled in urban areas such as Mogadishu and Baidoa. Displacement numbers continue to rise as more people leave their homes and displacement monitoring increases. IOM and other UN agencies estimate that the number of IDPs, a highly vulnerable group in Somalia, will rise to 3 million by June if the April–June rains are below average or fail entirely. Additionally, since January 2016, about 56,000 former Somali refugees have returned from Kenya's Dadaab refugee camp to Somalia through UNHCR's voluntary repatriation program and have settled in Gedo, Bay, Lower Jubba, and Banaadir.

Causes
Main causes of the drought and its impact are said to be instability, conflict and climate change with severe weather conditions potentially also playing a part. El Niño may be the drought's cause.

Humanitarian situation
On 4 March, Somalia's prime minister Hassan Ali Khaire announced that at least 110 people died due to hunger and diarrhoea in Bay Region alone.

The FAO Representative for Somalia, noted that the situation in many rural areas, particularly Bay, Puntland is starting to look "worryingly like the run-up to famine in 2010-2011".

The International Organization for Migration also warned that if "action is not taken immediately, early warning signals point towards a growing humanitarian crisis in Somalia of potentially catastrophic proportions".

Hassan Saadi Noor, Save the Children's Country Director in Somalia stated:

In addition to drought and famine, diseases, such as cholera and measles were spread.

As of March 2017, more than 8,400 cases of the cholera had already been confirmed since January, which claimed 200 lives. On 20 March 2017, at least 26 people died from hunger in the semi-autonomous Jubaland region of southern Somalia, according to the state media.

As of July 2017, unclean drinking water had caused over 71,000 cases of cholera or severe diarrhea in 2017, resulting in nearly 1,100 deaths.

Calls for response

Immediate response
On 2 February 2017 a senior United Nations humanitarian official in Somalia warned of a famine in some of the worst drought-affected areas without a massive and urgent scale up of humanitarian assistance in the coming weeks. He also stated that the omission of such an immediate response "will cost lives, further destroy livelihoods, and could undermine the pursuit of key State-building and peacebuilding initiatives". On 8 March 2017 United Nations Secretary-General António Guterres urged a massive scale up in international support to avert a famine.

Adequate response

While the particular drought can only be dealt with by an immediate response some suggest foresight and preventive, long-term, more cost-efficient and appropriate measures. Esther Ngumbi, researcher at the Department of Entomology and Plant Pathology at Auburn University in Alabama, suggests that Horn of Africa's repetitive cycles of drought and hunger crisis should be responded to with "strategic integration and coordination between governments and NGOs" to "help farmers become more resilient to drought and other climate change-related disaster". Furthermore, she states that once this has been achieved, innovative ways to disseminate available information and solutions to farmers would be needed. Mohamed Abdulkadir, field manager of Save the Children notes that food deliveries destroy local markets. German Federal Minister of Economic Cooperation and Development Gerd Müller suggested a billion-strong crisis-fund for the United Nations to allow it to act preventively.

Response

Government response
On 28 February 2017, Somali President Mohamed Abdullahi Mohamed declared the drought a national disaster.

Germany
According to reports of 1 May 2017 in a visit to the country Germany's foreign minister Sigmar Gabriel pledged to at least doubling the 70 million euros of aid and stated in a press conference with Somali prime minister Hassan Ali Khaire that the "international state community has to do more against the famine catastrophe". Furthermore, he asks the international community to no longer view Somalia as a failed state "but as a state which laboriously struggles to recreate a reliable state structure" enabling it to "guarantee security".

European Union 
At the International Conference on Somalia in London on 11 May 2017, the European Union pledged 200 million euros. Mohamed thanked the donors, emphasizing in his speech that Somalia wished to stand on its own two feet again, and he calling on the participants at the conference to hold his administration accountable if they failed to achieve this.

See also
 2011 East Africa drought
 2017 South Sudan famine
 2020-2023 Horn of Africa Drought
2021 Somali drought
 Food security
 Water security

References

External links
 SaveTheChildren: Somalia
 United Nations Assistance Mission in Somalia
 Hunger in Ostafrika - ein Problem für alle, (German)

Drought,Somalia,2017
Drought,2017
Drought
Somalia 2017
Somalia
21st-century famines
Drought in Somalia
2007 disasters in Somalia